Maionia or Maeonia, was a city of the Hellenistic, Roman and Byzantine era located near the Hermos River, in ancient Lydia. Both Ramsay and Talbert tentatively identified the ancient polis with the modern village of Koula (Turkish for fortress) a village known for its carpet manufacture. 

The town is mentioned by mentioned by Pliny the Elder, Hierocles, and in the Notitiae Episcopatuum. Several coins from Maionia exist. In antiquity the city was part of the Katakekaumene Decapolis of towns. Once the seat of a residential bishop, it remains a titular see of the Roman Catholic Church.

Its site is located near Menye in Asiatic Turkey.

References

Ancient Greek archaeological sites in Turkey
Populated places in ancient Lydia
Roman towns and cities in Turkey
Catholic titular sees in Asia
Populated places of the Byzantine Empire
History of Manisa Province